This is a list of films produced by the Tollywood film industry based in Hyderabad in the 1960s.

1960s
Telugu
Telugu films